Collection is a compilation album of jazz songs by American pianist Joe Sample that was released in 1991 through GRP Records.

This album sampler includes tracks from albums released in 1978-1985 while Joe Sample recorded with Blue Thumb and MCA recording companies.

Track listing
All tracks by Joe Sample except where noted.

 "Carmel" – 5:39
 "Woman You're Driving Me Mad" – 6:12
 "A Rainy Day in Monterey" – 5:42
 "Sunrise" – 5:22
 "There Are Many Stops Along The Way" – 4:41
 "Rainbow Seeker" – 5:25
 "Fly With the Wings Of Love" – 7:36
 "Burnin' Up The Carnival" (Will Jennings, Sample) (featuring Flora Purim) – 7:19
 "Night Flight" (Special Radio Edit) – 4:59
 "Oasis" – 5:03

Personnel 

Andy Baltimore – Director, Creative Director
Russ Bracher – Engineer, Assistant Engineer
Garnett Brown – Trombone
Lenny Castro – Percussion
Leon "Ndugu" Chancler – Drums, Timbales, Producer, Linn Drum
F. Byron Clark – Engineer, Mixing
Paulinho Da Costa – Percussion
Jay Deversa – Trumpet
Joseph Doughney – Producer, Post Production
Nathan East – Bass
Edward Sonny Emory – Drums
David Ervin – Synthesizer, Programming, Synthesizer Programming
Wilton Felder – Producer
David Gibb – Graphic Design, Design
William Green – Flute, Piccolo, Saxophone
Carl Griffen – Producer, Compilation Producer
Carl Griffin – Producer, Compilation
Dave Grusin – Executive Producer
Stix Hooper – Percussion, Drums, Producer
Fred Jackson, Jr. – Saz, Saxophone
Paul Jackson, Jr. – Electric Guitar
Josie James – Vocals
Ted Jensen – Mastering
Scott Johnson – Design
Abraham Laboriel – Bass
Michael Landy – Producer, Digital Editing, Editing, Post Production
Michelle Lewis – Production Coordination
Steve Medajo – Trumpet
Sonny Mediana – Graphic Design, Design
Byron Miller – Bass
Robert O'Bryant – Trumpet
Ray Parker Jr. – Rhythm Guitar
Dean Parks – Acoustic & Electric Guitar
Rik Pekkonen – Engineer, Mixing
John Phillips – Bass Clarinet 
Robert Popwell – Bass
Billy Rogers – Guitar
Larry Rosen – Executive Producer
Andy Ruggirello – Graphic Design, Design
Joe Sample – Synthesizer, Piano, Strings, Arranger, Conductor, Keyboards, Piano (Electric), Producer, Liner Notes, Fender Rhodes, Orchestration, String Arrangements, Synthesizer Piano, Piano (Grand), String Conductor
Dan Serrano – Graphic Design, Design
Sid Sharp – Strings
Dr. George Shaw – Synthesizer, Programming
George Shaw – Programming
Zan Stewart – Liner Notes
Greg Venable – Engineer
Ernie Watts – Flute, Piccolo, Saxophone
Pauline Wilson – Background Vocals

References

External links
[ Collection by Joe Sample – AMG]

Joe Sample albums
1991 compilation albums